Daniele Ganser (born August 29, 1972, in Lugano) is a Swiss author. He is best known for his 2005 book NATO's Secret Armies, an adaption of his 2001 dissertation.

Background
His father Gottfried Ganser-Bosshart (1922–2014), whose parents were Germans, was a Protestant pastor of the Federation of Swiss Protestant Churches (SEK). His mother was a nurse.

Daniele Ganser was a senior researcher at the ETH Zurich, Center for Security Studies (CSS). He was president (2006-2012) of the Swiss branch of the "Association for the Study of Peak Oil and Gas" (ASPO), and taught a course (2012-2017) titled History and Future of Energy Systems at the University of St. Gallen.

Writing career

NATO's Secret Armies 
In 2004, Ganser published NATO's Secret Armies: Operation Gladio and Terrorism in Western Europe. In this book, Ganser states that Gladio units were in close cooperation with NATO and the CIA and that Gladio in Italy was responsible for terrorist attacks against the Italian civilian population. Security analyst John Prados observed that Ganser presented evidence that Gladio networks amounted to anti-democratic elements across many nations.

Beatrice Heuser praised the book while also commenting Ganser's book would have been improved by the author using a less polemical tone and had occasionally conceded problems with the Soviets. The political scientist Markus Linden said that Ganser fostered anti-Americanism under the label of Peace Research, while he unilaterally presented Russia positively.

Critics charged that the book failed to provide proof or an in-depth explanation of a conspiracy between NATO, the United States, and  European countries. Peer Henrik Hansen criticized Ganser for basing his claim on the US Army Field Manual 30-31B which members of the intelligence community claim is a "Cold War era hoax document." Philip H.J. Davies concluded that the book is marred by imagined conspiracies, exaggerated notions and misunderstandings of covert activities and operations within and between the countries, and a failure to place their decisions and actions in the appropriate historical context. Davies argued that Ganser did not perform the most basic necessary research to be able to discuss them effectively. Olav Riste of the Norwegian Institute for Defence Studies mentions several instances where his own research on the stay-behind network in Norway was twisted by Ganser. Riste and Leopoldo Nuti concluded that the book's "ambitious conclusions do not seem to be entirely corroborated by a sound evaluation of the sources available." Lawrence Kaplan commended Ganser for making "heroic efforts to tease out the many strands that connect this interlocking right-wing conspiracy", but also argued that connecting the dots required a stretch of facts. Kaplan believes that some of Ganser's theories may be correct, but they damage the book's credibility.

Later work 
Ganser calls into question the conclusions of the 9/11 Commission. He also promotes skepticism of the COVID-19 pandemic. The Americanist Michael Butter calls Ganser the "best-known conspiracy theorist in the German-speaking world". His public doubts about the "official version" of the 9/11 attacks had led to the termination of his university activities.

Publications

English
Articles
 "Terrorism in Western Europe: An Approach to NATO's Secret Stay-behind Armies." Whitehead Journal of Diplomacy and International Relations, vol. 6, no. 1. pp. 69–97.
 "Fear As A Weapon: The Effects Psychological Warfare on Domestic and International Politics." World Affairs: The Journal of International Issues, vol. 9, no. 4 (2005), pp. 24–40. .
 "The British Secret Service in Neutral Switzerland: An Unfinished Debate on NATO's Cold War Stay-behind Armies." Intelligence and National Security, vol. 20, no. 5 (2005). pp. 553–580..
 "The Ghost of Machiavelli: An Approach to Operation Gladio and Terrorism in Cold War Italy." Crime, Law and Social Change, vol. 45, no. 2 (Mar. 2006), pp. 111–154. .
 "The CIA in Western Europe and the Abuse of Human Rights." Intelligence and National Security, vol. 21, no. 5 (Oct. 2006), pp. 760–781. .

Books
 Reckless Gamble—The Sabotage of the United Nations in the Cuban Conflict and the Missile Crisis of 1962. New Orleans: University Press of the South (Dec. 2000). .
 NATO's Secret Armies: Operation Gladio and Terrorism in Western Europe. London: Routledge (2005). .

Book contributions
 "The 'Strategy of Tension' in the Cold War Period" (Chapter 6). In: 9/11 and the American Empire: Intellectuals Speak Out. Edited by David Ray Griffin and Peter Dale Scott. Northampton, Mass.: Olive Branch Press (2007), pp. 79–99. .
 "America is Addicted to Oil: U.S. Secret Warfare and Dwindling Oil Reserves in the Context of Peak Oil and 9/11." In: The Dual State: Parapolitics, Carl Schmitt and the National Security Complex, by Eric Wilson. UK: Ashgate (2012). .

Other languages
Articles
 "L'OTAN Menace Notre Sécurité," with Hans von Sponeck and Gabriel Galice. Le Temps [Genèva] (Apr. 3, 2017), pp. 6+.

Books
 Der Alleingang—Die Schweiz 10 Jahre nach dem EWR-Nein, with Uwe Wagschal and Hans Rentsch. Zürich: Orell Füssli Verlag (Dec. 2002). .
English: "Going it Alone—Switzerland 10 Years After the EWR-Nein."
 Europa im Erdölrausch: Die Folgen einer gefährlichen Abhängigkeit. Zürich: Orell Füssli Verlag (2012). .
English: "Europe in the Oil Frenzy: The Consequences of Dangerous Addiction."
 Illegale Kriege: Wie die NATO-Länder die UNO sabotieren. Eine Chronik von Kuba bis Syrien. Zürich: Orell Füssli Verlag (2016). .   
English: "Illegal Wars: How the NATO Countries Sabotage the UN. A Chronicle from Cuba to Syria."
 Imperium USA: Die Skrupellose Weltmacht. Zürich: Orell Füssli Verlag (2020). .

Book contributions
 "Peak Oil: Erdöl im Spannungsfeld von Krieg und Frieden." In: Energie, by Phillip Rudolf von Rohr, Peter Walde, Bertram Battlog. vdf Hochschulverlag an der ETH Zürich (2009), pp. 45–60. .
English: "Peak Oil: Crude oil in the Field of Tension Between War and Peace." In: "Energy."

References

External links
 Official website
 Daniele Ganser at IMDb
 Bibliography in edoc at University of Basel
Information about Daniele Ganser on the website of the SIPER Institute (founded by Ganser)
 Schattenkrieger der NATO (German) ZDF (Public Service Television) March 25, 2014 (Mediathek) featuring Ganser and others
 All of the theories about 9/11 are conspiracy theories comment by Kristin Aalen, aftenbladet.no April 21, 2008
 Diamonds (and Disinformation) Are Forever. John R. Schindler on Ganser's NATO’s Secret Armies

1972 births
Living people
People from Lugano
21st-century Swiss historians
University of Basel alumni
9/11 conspiracy theorists
COVID-19 conspiracy theorists
20th-century Swiss historians
Swiss conspiracy theorists
Swiss people of German descent
Anti-Americanism